Winnfield is a small city in, and the parish seat of, Winn Parish, Louisiana, United States. The population was 5,749 at the 2000 census, and 4,840 in 2010. Three governors of the state of Louisiana were from Winnfield.

History

When Winn Parish was officially formed by the state legislature in 1852, Winnfield was established as the parish seat. During the Civil War, the area around Winnfield was the site of some minor skirmishes.  Confederate forces defeated a Union detachment sent to destroy the Cary Salt Works in the area.

Many Civil War bandits made the region their home. Among these were the West and Kimbrill clans, which at one time included Frank and Jesse James.

Three Louisiana governors were Winnfield natives and grew up here: Huey Long, Oscar K. Allen and Earl Long. Huey Long became governor, U.S. Senator. He was assassinated in 1935.  Oscar K. Allen was elected governor in 1932. Earl Long, "the Louisiana Longshot," served in a variety of state positions, said to be more than other Louisianan, including elective office.  He was elected governor in 1939, 1948 and 1956.  He was elected to Congress in 1960 but died before he could assume office.

Winnfield was a major producer of salt in the Civil War days; salt kettles used at Big Cedar furnished salt for the Confederate army. One still exists today in front of the Louisiana Political Museum and Hall of Fame, turned into a fountain. The salt works was located on Saline Bayou. Later the Cary Salt Works started an 840 ft deep mine south of Winnfield. The mine was used by the federal government in Project Coyboy Plowshare Program, Cowboy Event. Between Dec 1959 and March 1960 a series of high explosives were set off inside the Carry Salt Works in an unused portion of the mine.  The mine later was flooded by an underground river. The mine and all equipment inside was abandoned.

The rock quarry operated near or on top of the salt mine and produced limestone and gravel still operates today as Winn Rock.

Geography
According to the United States Census Bureau, the city has a total area of 3.3 square miles (8.6 km2), all land. North and west of Winnfield, Saline Bayou, a National Wild and Scenic Rivers System waterway, offers blackwater canoeing as well as fishing.

Winnfield is about a three-hour driving distance from Baton Rouge.

Demographics

2020 census

As of the 2020 United States census, there were 4,153 people, 1,967 households, and 1,173 families residing in the city.

2000 census
As of the census of 2000, there were 5,749 people, 2,172 households, and 1,446 families residing in the city. The racial makeup of the city was 48.29% White, 49.83% African American, 0.38% Native American, 0.16% Asian, 0.16% from other races, and 1.18% from two or more races. Hispanic or Latino of any race were 1.15% of the population.

There were 2,172 households, out of which 33.1% had children under the age of 18 living with them, 36.9% were married couples living together, 24.4% had a female householder with no husband present, and 33.4% were non-families. 30.2% of all households were made up of individuals, and 14.5% had someone living alone who was 65 years of age or older. The average household size was 2.54 and the average family size was 3.15.

In the city, the population was spread out, with 29.6% under the age of 18, 9.5% from 18 to 24, 24.3% from 25 to 44, 19.4% from 45 to 64, and 17.2% who were 65 years of age or older. The median age was 34 years. For every 100 females, there were 84.7 males. For every 100 females age 18 and over, there were 77.5 males.

The median income for a household in the city was $19,342, and the median income for a family was $25,201. Males had a median income of $27,123 versus $14,267 for females. The per capita income for the city was $10,180. About 25.2% of families and 31.7% of the population were below the poverty line, including 43.5% of those under age 18 and 28.9% of those age 65 or over.

Shane Bauer, a journalist for Mother Jones, described Winnfield as "very poor".

Economy
, according to Bauer, Walmart, Winn Correctional Center, and the area lumber mill offer the majority of the jobs in the Winnfield area; because of the poverty in the area residents are willing to take low-paying jobs at Winn Correctional Center despite the danger present there.

Museums
Louisiana Political Museum and Hall of Fame

Annual Events
 Uncle Earl's Hog Dog Trialsa yearly bay dog event
 Louisiana Forest Festival

Education

Public schools
Winn Parish School Board operates local public schools, which include:
 Winnfield Senior High School (912)
 Winnfield Middle School (58)
 Winnfield Intermediate School (now closed)
 Winnfield Primary School (K4)
 Winnfield Kindergarten School (now closed)

Higher education
Central Louisiana Technical Community College — Huey P. Long campus

Media

Newspaper
 Winn Parish Enterprise
 Winn Parish Journal
 The piney Woods Journal

TV
 KCDH-LP Cable only

Radio

Notable people
 Morris N. Abrams – educator
 Oscar K. Allen – Governor of Louisiana
 George Washington Bolton - businessman and patriarch of the Bolton family of Alexandria; lived in Winnfield in the latter 1860s
 James W. Bolton – banker in Alexandria; son of George Washington Bolton
 Harley Bozeman – tree farmer, politician, historian, confidant of Huey and Earl Long
 P. J. Brown – professional basketball player
 Earl K. Long – Governor of Louisiana
 Huey Pierce Long Jr. – Governor of Louisiana, senator from Louisiana
 Terry Reeves - district attorney for Winn Parish (1991-2005)
 William Jay Smith – Poet Laureate Consultant in Poetry to the Library of Congress between 1968 and 1970
 Anthony Thomas – professional American football player
 Thomas D. Milling - Brigadier General, United States Air Force

In popular culture
Portions of the 1989 film, Blaze, starring Paul Newman, were filmed in Winnfield and Saline.

References

External links

Cities in Louisiana
Cities in Winn Parish, Louisiana
Parish seats in Louisiana
Cities in the Ark-La-Tex
Cities in the Central Louisiana
County seats in the Ark-La-Tex